Marwitzia is a genus of moths of the family Crambidae.

Species
Marwitzia centiguttalis Gaede, 1917
Marwitzia costinigralis Maes, 1998
Marwitzia dichocrocis (Hampson, 1913)

Former species
Marwitzia polystidzalis (Hampson, 1918)

References
Gaede, 1917. Neue Lepidopteren des Berliner Zoologischen Museums 

Spilomelinae
Taxa named by Max Gaede
Crambidae genera